Santa Claus is a folkloric figure in many Western cultures associated with Christmas.

Santa Claus may also refer to:

Entertainment 
 Santa Claus: A Morality, a 1946 play by E. E. Cummings
 Santa Claus (1898 film), a British short silent drama
 Santa Claus (1912 film), a British silent film based in the 1912 Scala Theatre production
 Santa Claus (1959 film), a 1959 Mexican film
 Santa Claus: The Movie, a 1985 Alexander Salkind film
 The Santa Clause (franchise), a series of films and a limited series starring Tim Allen
 The Santa Clause, a 1994 film
 The Santa Clause 2, a 2002 sequel to the 1994 film
 The Santa Clause 3: The Escape Clause, a 2006 sequel to the 2002 film
 The Santa Clauses, a 2022 limited TV series
 "Santa Claus" (Roseanne), a 1991 television episode

Places in the United States 
 Santa Claus, Arizona, an uninhabited desert town
 Santa Claus, Georgia, a city
 Santa Claus, Indiana, a town

People
Santa Claus (Alaskan politician), American politician

Sports 
 FC Santa Claus, a Finnish football club
 Santa Claus (horse) (1961–1970), Irish racehorse
 Santa Claus Cup, an annual international figure skating competition organized by the Hungarian National Skating Federation

Ships   

 Santa Claus (steamboat), a passenger-cargo steamboat built in 1845 for service on New York's Hudson River

See also 
Christmas gift-bringer
List of Christmas and winter gift-bringers by country
Amu Nowruz, Iranian
Ded Moroz, Slavic
Father Christmas, English
Joulupukki, Finnish
Julemanden, Danish
Jultomten, Swedish
Mikulás, Hungarian
Olentzero, Basque
Père Noël, French
Sinterklaas, Dutch
Father Christmas (disambiguation)
Santa claws (disambiguation)
Santa (disambiguation)
The Life and Adventures of Santa Claus (disambiguation)